Flo & Friends is an American syndicated daily comic strip drawn by Jenny Campbell and distributed by Creators Syndicate. The comic was originally created by John Gibel in 2002.

Concept

Flo & Friends centers on Flo, a senior citizen whose life does not conform to the stereotypes about the elderly. She hosts a radio show and works hard to stay mentally youthful and active. Flo's granddaughter Treggie lives with her and does a lot to keep Flo young, and also frequently highlights the vast differences between her own generation and her grandmother's.

The strip also features Flo's close friends, Ruthie and Winnie, as well as Treggie's Uncles Larry and Jack, and Cleo the cat and Jasper the dog.

The strip's creator John Gibel, had the idea to create a strip about seniors while volunteering at non-profit organizations in Cleveland, Ohio.  However, he felt he needed help since "he knew he wasn’t funny or artistic," so he enlisted Jenny Campbell, a freelance illustrator, and John Murtha to assist.  Campbell assumed responsibility for the strip after the sudden death of John Gibel in early 2005.

Jenny Campbell grew up in the Phoenix–Scottsdale area, and graduated from Arizona State University in 1979, beginning as a fine arts major, but finishing with a BA in journalism.  While still in college, she started at The Arizona Republic as the paper's first female copyboy and went on to become a picture editor, occasional feature writer and sometime cartoonist.   She then worked for the Pasadena Star-News and the Orange County Register.  She eventually ended up in Chagrin Falls, Ohio in 1996, enabling her to connect with John Gibel through a mutual friend.

References

External links
Flo & Friends on Creators.com- updated daily

American comics
2002 comics debuts
Gag-a-day comics
Comics about women
Female characters in comics
Fictional radio personalities
Comics set in the United States